George J. Michelsen Furniture Factory is a historic factory located in the north-central neighborhood of Rochester, Monroe County, New York.  It was built in 1914, and is a four-story, "L"-shaped brick building with a flat roof.  It is of heavy timber frame construction and features large window openings. The building housed a bedroom furniture manufacturing concern until the late-1950s.

It was listed on the National Register of Historic Places in 2012.

References

Furniture companies of the United States
Industrial buildings and structures on the National Register of Historic Places in New York (state)
Industrial buildings completed in 1914
Industrial buildings and structures in Rochester, New York
National Register of Historic Places in Rochester, New York